Roberto Rafael Campa Cifrián (born 11 January 1957) is a Mexican lawyer and politician who was the New Alliance presidential candidate in the 2006 elections. His slogan was Uno de tres ("One out of three", referring to his party's request that voters give them one of their three votes, for senators, deputies, or president).

Political career
Campa holds a bachelor's degree in law from the Universidad Anáhuac.  As a member of the Institutional Revolutionary Party (PRI) he was elected to public office several times and served in the Federal District government in various positions during the 1980s.   From 1991 to 1994 he served in the Federal District Legislative Assembly and in 1994 he was elected to serve in the Chamber of Deputies.  From 1997 to 1999 he served as the head of the Procuraduría Federal del Consumidor (consumer protection agency).  In 2003 he was elected again to the Chamber of Deputies.

During the PRI primaries for the 2006 elections Campa joined the PRI group Unidad Democrática, also known as TUCOM (Spanish acronym for Todos Unidos Contra Madrazo, a reference to party boss and eventual candidate Roberto Madrazo). He resigned from the PRI in 2005.

On 10 January 2018 he was named the Secretary of Labor by President Enrique Peña Nieto.

References

Presidential run
On January 8, 2006 the New Alliance party elected Campa Cifrián as its presidential candidate for the 2006 election.  At the end of the day, he secured around 1% of the total vote.

External links
The Official Campaign website
Profile as federal deputy

1957 births
Living people
Members of the Chamber of Deputies (Mexico) for Mexico City
Candidates in the 2006 Mexican presidential election
Institutional Revolutionary Party politicians
New Alliance Party (Mexico) politicians
Members of the Congress of Mexico City
Mexican Secretaries of Labor
Universidad Anáhuac México alumni
20th-century Mexican politicians
21st-century Mexican politicians
Politicians from Mexico City